Stephanie Glance is an American basketball coach.

Career
She was hired as the head women's basketball coach at Columbia University in April 2013. She had spent the previous three years s the head coach at Illinois State University. She was a special assistant at the University of Tennessee under Pat Summitt, the all-time winningest NCAA Basketball coach and was the former interim head coach of the women's basketball team at North Carolina State University, succeeding Kay Yow in 2009.  The 2008–09 season is her 15th with the team, as she was previously an associate head coach and recruiting coordinator.

In her first year at Illinois State, the team had a record of 24 wins and 11 losses. The WBCA recognized this performance by selecting her for the Maggie Dixon Award, which is awarded to the coach with the best performance in their rookie year as a head coach.

After coaching for three years at Illinois State, she was hired as head women's basketball coach at Columbia University. She coached there for two seasons before stepping down to be the new Executive Director of the Kay Yow Cancer Fund.

Glance is from Waynesville, NC and a former student of Tuscola High School.

Head coaching record
Source: Columbia

References

Year of birth missing (living people)
Living people
People from Waynesville, North Carolina
NC State Wolfpack women's basketball coaches
Tuscola High School alumni
Illinois State Redbirds women's basketball coaches
Tennessee Lady Volunteers basketball coaches
American women's basketball coaches
Basketball coaches from North Carolina
Columbia Lions women's basketball coaches